Sharda may refer to:

 Sharda (1942 film), a 1942 Bollywood film
 Sharda (1981 film), a 1981 Bollywood drama film
 Sharda (singer) (born 1937), playback singer in 1960s and 1970s Hindi films
 Sharda, Azad Kashmir, Neelum District, Azad Kashmir, Pakistan
 Sharda River, a Ghagra-Ganges tributary that runs along the Nepal/India border
 Sharada script, a script used to write Kashmiri
 Sharda University, in Greater Noida, Uttar Pradesh, India
 A name of the Hindu goddess Saraswati

See also

 Sharada (disambiguation)
 Sharla, a given name